Nyang Tingngezin Sangpo (? – ?), also known as Nyang Tingngezin or Banchenpo Tingngezin, was a Buddhist monk of the Tibetan Empire. He was the master of Sadnalegs. After Trisong Detsen's death, Tibet was in a turmoil, two prince were murdered. Nyang Tingngezin protected the youngest prince Sadnalegs, and finally helped him succeeded the throne in 798. He was appointed as the first "Banchenpo" ("Monk Minister") and seized the power. His name can be found in a pillar which still stands outside the zhyu'i lta khang temple in Maizhokunggar today.

After the anti-Buddhist king Langdarma came to the power, Nyang Tingngezin tried to flee to India, but was captured and executed.

9th-century Tibetan people
Buddhist monks from Tibet